Comstock Park Public Schools (CPPS) is a school district in Michigan, headquartered in the Comstock Park census-designated place, and in Plainfield Township, Kent County, Michigan.

The district has about 2,500 students. The school district serves Alpine Township, Plainfield Township, and Walker.

Schools
Greenridge Elementary School serves preschool, and ECSE. Stoney Creek Elementary School serves kindergarten and grades 1 and 2. Pine Island Elementary School serves 3 through 5. Mill Creek Middle School has grades 6 through 8. Comstock Park High School serves grades 9 through 12. The district used to include North Kent Alternative High School (9-12) but the school was shut down after the 2011–12 school year.

Schools within the Comstock Park CDP include Greenridge Elementary, Stoney Creek Elementary, Mill Creek Middle School, and Comstock Park High School.

Schools within Alpine Township include Greenridge Elementary and Stoney Creek Elementary.

Schools within Plainfield Township include Pine Island Elementary, Mill Creek Middle School, and Comstock Park High School.

District population breakdown:
Greenridge Elementary School: 224 Students
Stoney Creek Elementary School: 362 Students
Pine Island Elementary School: 456 Students
Mill Creek Middle School: 465 Students
Comstock Park High School: 657 Students
North Kent (Alternative) High School: 101 Students
Total District enrollment: 2266
Source: PublicSchoolsReport.com
See Also: Comstock Park School Webpage

References

External links

Comstock Park Public Schools

School districts in Michigan
Education in Kent County, Michigan